Mount Dragovan is the highest summit in the Apocalypse Peaks of Victoria Land, rising to ) west of Wreath Valley in the western part of the group. Named in 2005 by the Advisory Committee on Antarctic Names after astronomer Mark W. Dragovan, who (1986) collaborated with Yerkes engineer Robert J. Pernic to build a telescope to observe the early formation of structure in the universe over nine field seasons at the Amundsen–Scott South Pole Station Center for Astrophysical Research in Antarctica, 1988–2000.

References

Dragovan